The founding fathers of the European Union are men who are considered to be major contributors to European unity and the development of what is now the European Union. The number and list of the founding fathers of the EU varies depending on the source. In a publication from 2013 the European Union listed 11 men. All but one (Winston Churchill from the United Kingdom) were from the Inner Six of the European Union.

Some sources list only a subset of the 11 men as founding fathers. The Council of Europe lists 6 founding fathers as builders of Europe, including the Briton Ernest Bevin. The media outlet Deutsche Welle presented a different constellation, it listed Richard Coudenhove-Kalergi, Winston Churchill, Robert Schuman, Jean Monnet and Paul-Henri Spaak as the 5 founding fathers of the EU. Other sources have emphasized Konrad Adenauer of Germany, Alcide De Gasperi of Italy and Robert Schuman of France as the founding fathers from the three pioneers countries of the European unification.

List
The European Union listed 11 people as its founding fathers in a publication from 2013. These are:

Other sources discuss fewer names.

Relabelling the founding fathers into EU pioneers
Commentators have pointed out that the founding fathers were all men. A clause of equality between men and women has been introduced in the Treaty of Rome for economic reasons because of concerns of dumping by countries that used low paid women labour.
In a new publication from 2021, the European Union listed 21 people labelled EU pioneers, in which 8 women names have been added to the list of the 11 founding fathers.
The women that were added to the list of EU pioneers are: Anna Lindh, Louise Weiss, Marga Klompé, Melina Mercouri, Nicole Fontaine, Nilde Iotti, Simone Veil and Ursula Hirschmann.

Proposals and Rome
Count Richard von Coudenhove-Kalergi (1894–1972) published the Paneuropa manifesto in 1923 which set up the movement of that name. At the start of the 1950s Robert Schuman (1886–1963), based on a plan by Jean Monnet (1888–1979), called for a European Coal and Steel Community in his "Schuman declaration". Monnet went on to become the first President of the High Authority. Schuman later served as President of the European Parliament and became notable for advancing European integration.

Following its creation, the Treaty of Rome established the European Economic Community. Although not all the people who signed the treaty are known as founding fathers, a number are, such as Paul-Henri Spaak (1899–1972), who also worked on the treaty as well as the Benelux union and was the first President of the European Parliament. Other founding fathers who signed the treaty were Konrad Adenauer (1876–1967) of Germany and Joseph Bech (1887–1975) of Luxembourg.

Others

Further men who have been considered founding fathers are: Giuseppe Mazzini (1805–1872) who founded the  association "Young Europe" in 1834 with the vision of a united continent; Victor Hugo (1802–1885) who made a speech where he called for United States of Europe in 1849 at the International Peace Congress of Paris; Milan Hodža (1878–1944) who was famous for his attempts to establish a democratic federation of Central European states (book: Federation in central Europe, reflections and reminiscences); Jacques Delors (born 1925), who was a successful Commission President in the 1980s and 90s; Lorenzo Natali (1922–1989); Carlo Azeglio Ciampi (1920–2016); Mário Soares (1924–2017), Portuguese Prime Minister at the time Portugal acceded the EC; and Pierre Werner (1913–2002) a Prime Minister of Luxembourg.

Some have considered American Secretary of State George C. Marshall as an influential force in developing the European Union. His namesake plan to rebuild Europe in the wake of World War II contributed more than $100 billion in today's dollars to the Europeans, helping to feed Europeans, deliver steel to rebuild industries, provide coal to warm homes, and construct dams to help provide power. In doing so, the Marshall Plan encouraged the integration of European powers into the European Coal and Steel Community, the precursor to present-day European Union, by illustrating the effects of economic integration and the need for coordination. The potency of the Marshall Plan caused former German Chancellor Helmut Schmidt to remark in 1997 that "America should not forget that the development of the European Union is one of its greatest achievements. Without the Marshall Plan it perhaps would never have come to that."

See also

 History of the European Union
 President of the European Commission
 President of the European Parliament
 List of presidents of the institutions of the European Union
 Richard von Coudenhove-Kalergi

References

 

History of the European Union